Jack Sweeney (born ) is an American programmer and entrepreneur. In 2022, he became known for creating Twitter bots to track the private jets of Russian oligarchs and other prominent individuals, including Elon Musk, through the ElonJet account.

Life 
Sweeney's father, a Technical Operations Controller for American Airlines, introduced him to aviation when he was young. Sweeney would use the data to track his father coming home when he commuted from Dallas back to Florida.

In the beginning of 2022, Sweeney was a freshman at the University of Central Florida, and was studying information technology. He intends to work in software engineering. In February 2022, Sweeney stated in an interview with Bloomberg Wealth that he was establishing a company called "Ground Control" that monitors flight activity of prominent billionaires.

Creation of flight monitoring tools 
As a teenager, he developed Twitter bots to track and share the locations of the private jets of several individuals including Elon Musk, Jeff Bezos, Mark Zuckerberg, Bill Gates, Donald Trump, and Drake. His program uses public data sources including the Federal Aviation Administration, OpenSky Network, and Automatic Dependent Surveillance–Broadcast. In June 2020, he created the "Elon Musk's Jet" Twitter account, dedicated to tracking Musk's private jet by using bots that scrape publicly available air traffic data. In November 2021, Musk cited security concerns and requested that Sweeney stop tracking his private Gulfstream jet in exchange for $5,000. Sweeney responded that he might stop tracking Musk's private jet in exchange for an internship, or a Tesla Model 3.

During the 2022 Russian invasion of Ukraine, Sweeney began tweeting the location of approximately 30 private jets belonging to Russian oligarchs. In a March 2022 interview with CBS MoneyWatch, Sweeney stated his desire to see their planes seized. Some oligarchs being tracked include Vladimir Putin, Len Blavatnik, Roman Abramovich, Alexander Abramov, Dmitry Rybolovlev, Arkady Rotenberg, Eugene Shvidler, Vladimir Potanin, Vagit Alekperov, Oleg Deripaska, Mikhail Prokhorov, Alisher Usmanov, Viktor Vekselberg, Leonid Mikhelson, Viktor Medvedchuk, Vladimir Lisin, Suleyman Kerimov, Oleg Tinkov, Yuri Linnik, Yevgeny Prigozhin, Dmitry Mazepin, and Alexei Mordashov.

In April 2022, Sweeney stopped tracking Mark Cuban's travel in exchange for his friendship and business advice.

In November 2022, after Musk bought Twitter, he said: "My commitment to free speech extends even to not banning the account following my plane, even though that is a direct personal safety risk". On December 14, 2022, Twitter suspended Sweeney's airplane-tracking accounts for Musk, Bill Gates, Jeff Bezos, Mark Zuckerberg and Russian oligarchs, as well as Sweeney's personal Twitter account. Sweeney reacted to the suspension, stating: "I mean, this looks horrible. He literally said he was keeping my account up for free speech". On December 15, a number of high-profile journalists were banned after covering Twitter's removal of the ElonJet account.

Legal threats from Elon Musk 
Musk also announced that he would be taking legal action against Sweeney. In relation to the legal action, Musk alleged that in Los Angeles, a car carrying his 2-year-old son was followed by a "crazy stalker" who thought Musk was inside, "blocked [the] car from moving" and "climbed onto [the] hood."  A Los Angeles Police detective in the stalking investigations unit said they had no evidence indicating that the alleged stalker had used ElonJet. Regarding the incident, South Pasadena police said that they were investigating "an assault with a deadly weapon involving a vehicle", and labelled a member of Musk's security team as a "suspect".

Sweeney has posted publicly available information about Musk's flights and airports used, but Sweeney did not share information about Musk's cars or family members. Sweeney denied being involved in the alleged stalking incident, stating that the ElonJet account had no posts in the 24 hours prior to the incident, and that the location of the alleged stalking incident was far from any airport; Sweeney also told the media that he believed Musk's legal threat against him was a bluff.

References

External links

Ground Control Site

Living people
Year of birth missing (living people)
Place of birth missing (living people)
2000s births
American computer programmers
21st-century American businesspeople
Businesspeople from Florida